John Charles Shuttleworth Rendall (1882 – 1965) was a British professional tennis player of the 1920s.  He won the Bristol Cup in France in 1921 (beating A. Page in final), 1922 (beating Joseph Negro in final) and 1923 (beating Joseph Negro in final).  The Bristol Cup was the top professional tournament in the early 1920s.  Before turning professional in 1921, Rendall had been an amateur tennis player.  He lost in the third round of Wimbledon men's singles in 1907 to Karl Behr. He lost in the second round of Wimbledon men's singles in 1912 to James Cecil Parke. Rendall was a Major in the Indian Army.

References

1882 births
1965 deaths
English male tennis players
British male tennis players
Tennis people from Derbyshire
Professional tennis players before the Open Era